John Pollow (fl. 1413–1419) of Exeter, Devon, was an English politician.

Family
John had one daughter.

Career
He was a Member (MP) of the Parliament of England for Exeter in May 1413, 1415, October 1416 and 1419.

References

14th-century births
15th-century deaths
English MPs May 1413
English MPs 1415
English MPs October 1416
English MPs 1419
Members of the Parliament of England (pre-1707) for Exeter